Tsholomnqa is a rural area and village situated in Eastern Cape in South Africa in the Mdantsane District.

Geography 
Situated in the Buffalo City Metropolitan Municipality near East London, it is the home village of the rugby player Makazole Mapimpi.

History 
Historic battles involving the Xhosa people took place in this region.

Notable people 
 Makazole Mapimpi

References 

 
Populated places in Buffalo City Metropolitan Municipality
Populated coastal places in South Africa